Barcice (until 2011 Barcice Górne ) is a village in the administrative district of Gmina Stary Sącz, within Nowy Sącz County, Lesser Poland Voivodeship, in southern Poland.

The village has a population of around 2500. The biggest landmark in the village is the Saint Mary church build in 1901. In 1910 the village of Barcice Dolne was separated from Barcice (thence until 2011 known as Barcice Górne).

References

Villages in Nowy Sącz County